Dennis Joel (born Dennis Joel Olivieri, August 29, 1947 - September 27, 2006) was an American child actor and singer.

Early years
The son of Mr. and Mrs. Alphonse Olivieri of Garfield, New Jersey, Joel attended Our Lady of Mount Virgin School before he moved to California with his mother and older brother. Beginning at age 5, he worked as a model for the Walter Thornton Agency. He began performing when at age 8 he sang a radio jingle for the local Yoo-hoo beverage company owned by his father.

Career
On Broadway, Joel went from being an understudy to portraying Patrick Dennis as a boy in Auntie Mame (1956). He continued in that role in a road company production and a West Coast production.

On television, Joel played Roy Strickland on The Betty Hutton Show, a situation comedy on CBS. He also appeared on Walt Disney Presents and The DuPont Show with June Allyson and did commercials on local TV. Billed as Dennis Olivieri, he portrayed Stanley on The New People and appeared in the made-for-TV film The Whole World Is Waiting. Joel starred in the S5 E37 "Long Distance Call" episode of Leave It To Beaver. Ray Montgomery played his News Paper editor father. 

His work in films included playing Ajax in Toby Tyler (1960).

Joel's personal appearances included co-starring with Hutton in a variety show that ran for 10 weeks at the Sahara Hotel in Las Vegas. He made three 45 rpm recordings on the Tape label and recorded one album on the VMC label.

References 

1947 births
20th-century American male actors
American male child actors
American male film actors
American male television actors
American male stage actors
Male actors from New Jersey
2006 deaths
People from Garfield, New Jersey